Eyes of the Forest is a 1923 American silent Western film directed by Lambert Hillyer and written by LeRoy Stone. The film stars Tom Mix, Pauline Starke, Sid Jordan, Buster Gardner, J. P. Lockney, and Thomas G. Lingham. The film was released on December 30, 1923, by Fox Film Corporation.

Plot
As described in a film magazine review, Bruce Thornton, Government Forest Ranger, while patrolling in his airplane is forced down by hostile timbermen. He finds Ruth Melier hiding in the woods from her husband Horgan, and says that she is suspected in the killing of her stepfather. After a series of confrontations, through Bruce's efforts Horgan is convicted of the murder. Bruce arrests some timber thieves and wins the affections of Ruth.

Cast

References

External links

1923 films
1923 Western (genre) films
Fox Film films
Films directed by Lambert Hillyer
American black-and-white films
Silent American Western (genre) films
1920s English-language films
1920s American films